Nanjanapuram is a Village Panchayat located in Erode district, in the Indian state of Tamil Nadu. This Village Panchayat is located in the periphery of Erode Municipal Corporation. Nanjanapuram village falls under Erode taluk, located off State Highway 96 (Tamil Nadu).

Demographics 
 census, Nanjanapuram village had a total population of 1,897 with 960 males and 937 females. Of the total population, 171 are under 6 years of age. Nanjanapuram has a literacy rate of 88.85%, which is lower than the Tamil Nadu average.

References

External link 
 GeoHack - Nanjanapuram

Villages in Erode district